Ebenezer Augustus Kwasi Akuoko (1928 – 2021) was a Ghanaian lawyer and politician. He was the Member of parliament for Mampong North in the Third Republic of Ghana. He became a member of parliament following a by-election due to the execution by firing squad of Afrifa and other senior military officers on 26 June 1979. Afrifa had won the seat in the 1979 Ghanaian general election but never got to take his seat in parliament. His execution followed a coup d'état on 4 June 1979 which led to the formation of the Armed Forces Revolutionary Council military government.
He was married to Sophia Nana Wiba Sackey with whom he had two daughters, Anastasia and Felicia. She died after a short illness in October 2019. Akuoko died in October 2021 aged 93. He had thirteen children.

See also 
List of MPs elected in the 1979 Ghanaian parliamentary election

References

1928 births
2021 deaths
Ghanaian MPs 1979–1981